Henry Maudslay (1771–1831) was a British machine tool innovator, tool and die maker, and inventor.

Maudslay may also refer to:
 Maudslay, Sons and Field
 Maudslay Motor Company, a British vehicle maker
 Maudslay State Park, a Massachusetts state park

People with the surname
 Alfred Maudslay (1850–1931), British colonial diplomat, explorer and archaeologist
 Algernon Maudslay (1873–1948), British sailor
 Reginald Walter Maudslay (1871-1934), founder of the Standard Motor Company

See also
 Maudsley